Benjamin Lee Kenney Sr. (born March 12, 1977) is an American musician from Brielle, New Jersey. He is the current bass guitarist for the band Incubus (since 2003) and had previously played in the Roots as a guitarist. He also records as a solo artist, usually recording every instrument and singing all vocals on his records.

Career
Kenney played guitar for the hip-hop group the Roots before he joined Incubus in 2003 after the departure of the bass guitarist and founding member Alex Katunich (aka Dirk Lance). He had previously played with Incubus members Mike Einziger and Jose Pasillas in Time Lapse Consortium.

Kenney plays at least six different instruments and sometimes plays drum duets with Incubus' drummer Jose Pasillas live on-stage.

He has also done studio work for artists including Justin Timberlake, Faith Evans, Erykah Badu and Blackalicious, and producers Timbaland and DJ Jazzy Jeff.

26, Maduro, Distance and Comfort and "Burn the Tapes" were all released by Kenney's own record company, Ghetto Crush Industries. Ghetto Crush has also released music for the Division Group, Aleda and Root Valdez. Kenney helped the Smyrk to produce their EP, New Fiction.

Solo career
Kenney started in New Jersey band called Racecar in 1994 with Jimmie Muller and Sam Hofman. After this, he and Chuck Treece started a musical duo called Supergrub in 1996, with three CDs released: Norma & Thurselle, Communicator and Challenger.

He has five solo albums, 26 released on December 1, 2004, Maduro released on March 1, 2006, Distance and Comfort released on January 15, 2008, Burn the Tapes released on October 1, 2010, and Leave On Your Makeup released on September 17, 2013. Kenney plays guitar, bass guitar and drums while singing and writing every part on the solo records. When touring to support his solo records he plays guitar and sings, accompanied by Ashley Mendel on bass guitar and vocals and Sekou Lumumba on drums.  Recently, Simon Harding from the band Fin has replaced Lumumba.

Equipment
His bass equipment includes Lakland bass guitars, Line 6 effects  and Mesa Boogie amplifiers. He has retrofitted several of his Lakland basses with JBE pickups. His collection of bass guitars includes a seafoam-green USA Joe Osborn, sunburst USA Joe Osborn with a fretless fingerboard, sunburst Skyline Joe Osborn, red Skyline Bob Glaub, shoreline gold Skyline Hollowbody, custom 44-94, light blue 44-94, cherry sunburst 55-94 with Gibson knobs, fiesta red 30" Jazz Bass (44-60), 1975 Fender Jazz Bass, Gibson SG Bass, Fender Jaguar Bass, and a  Hofner 500/1 "Beatle Bass".  Most of his bass guitars have rosewood fingerboards and are strung with GHS flatwounds, with the exception of the Skyline Bob Glaub and the 55-94 which are strung with Thomastik-Infeld roundwounds. Kenny also plays Gibson Les Pauls which is seen in the DVD video for "Not Today". His live Mesa/Boogie rig consists of a pair of Big Block 750 heads and a Roadready 8x10 cabinet. In the studio and for solo gigs and small live gigs with Incubus, he uses Mesa Walkabout 1x12 combos and extension cabs.

Personal Life
In January 2023, Kenney announced that he had a brain tumor removed, and that Tal Wilkenfeld would play bass for Incubus while he recovered from brain surgery.

Discography

With Incubus
 A Crow Left of the Murder... (2004)
 Light Grenades (2006)
 If Not Now, When? (2011)
 Trust Fall (Side A) (2015)
 8 (2017)
 Trust Fall (Side B) (2020)

Solo
 26 (2004)
 Maduro (2006)
 Distance and Comfort (2008)
 Burn the Tapes (2010)
 Leave on your Makeup – EP (2013)
 Must Be Nice – (2019)

With The Roots
 Phrenology (2002)

Guest Appearances
 Justified - Justin Timberlake (guitar on "Right For Me") (2002)

Notes

External links

Kenney's website
Incubus' official website
The Division Group website
Supergrub website
Ghetto Crush Industries website
Ben Kenney interview with TheGrixer.com

Incubus (band) members
The Roots members
African-American rock musicians
American male singers
African-American rock singers
American rock bass guitarists
American male bass guitarists
1977 births
Living people
People from Brielle, New Jersey
Alternative hip hop musicians
American male guitarists
21st-century American singers
21st-century American bass guitarists
Time-Lapse Consortium members
African-American guitarists